Agro's Cartoon Connection was an Australian children's television show that aired on the Seven Network from 1990 to 1997. Shown on weekday mornings, it was primarily hosted by Agro, a puppet played by comedian Jamie Dunn. It was originally filmed at BTQ7 from 1990 to 1996, after which it moved to ATN7 in 1997.

History 
Over the years the show had a number of co-hosts including Ann-Maree Biggar, Terasa Livingstone, Holly Brisley, Michael R Gibson (who was known to the audience by the nickname "Gibbo") and guest hosts Ian Calder and Stacey Thomson.

It began as Seven's Super Saturday, later becoming The Super Saturday Show, which only aired on Saturday mornings and was originally only broadcast in Brisbane.

It followed on from a show called The Cartoon Connection which had been hosted for many years previously by Michael Horrocks and Alex Wileman, Wileman went on to do New South Wales lottery broadcasts.

The show consisted of playing a variety of cartoons including Popeye and Son, Samurai Pizza Cats and Sailor Moon while including small editorials presented between the cartoons in a variety of segments. One such example included Ian Calder appearing in a regular segment acting as a character, one of his more popular being Crikey the Clown where he would walk around the streets of Brisbane in an aggressive manner asking questions to anyone he met.

Other shows presented during the series' run included G.I. Joe, The Bots Master, Sonic the Hedgehog, A Pup Named Scooby-Doo and Mega Man. The Sunday morning edition of the program ran under the name The Super Sunday Show and included skits performed by the regulars, as well as presenting the UK sci-fi program UFO.

Notably the show's humour was sometimes provocative but always done in a way that would escape the notice of the show's primary audience of children.  The program was criticised in Parliament for including product sponsorship within the program itself, rather than simply running commercial breaks.

In its final years the show lost in the ratings to its competitor Cheez TV, causing the Seven Network to cut its running time and funding until it was cancelled. Ultimately, after several experiments, Seven decided not to continue aiming its breakfast programming at children, and eventually created the successful Sunrise program instead. This program currently occupies the morning timeslot.

Cast

Awards 

|-
! scope="row" | 1991
| rowspan="7" | Logie Awards
| rowspan="7" | Most Popular Children's Program
| rowspan="7" | Agro's Cartoon Connection
| 
| 
|-
! scope="row" | 1992
| 
| 
|-
! scope="row" | 1993
| 
| 
|-
! scope="row" | 1994
| 
| 
|-
! scope="row" | 1995
| 
| 
|-
! scope="row" | 1996
| 
| 
|-
! scope="row" | 1997
| 
|

See also 

 List of Australian television series

References

External links 
 

Seven Network original programming
1990 Australian television series debuts
1997 Australian television series endings
Television programming blocks in Australia
Australian children's television series
Australian television shows featuring puppetry
Television shows set in Brisbane
Television shows set in Sydney
English-language television shows
Australian comedy television series